Photo-story  may refer to:

 Photo Story, a Windows XP software program by Microsoft, intended for making a slideshow
 Photo-essay, a distinctive form of photojournalism seen in magazines and some newspapers
 Photo comics, also known as fumetti, a form of sequential storytelling that uses photographs instead of illustration